Andrea Abigail Álvarez Donis (born 13 January 2003) is a Guatemalan footballer who plays as a forward for Spanish Primera Federación club SD Eibar and the Guatemala women's national team.

Club career
Álvarez has played for Comunicaciones FC in Guatemala, where she scored more than 200 league goals. On 26 July 2021, she was signed by Zaragoza CFF in Spain.

International career
Álvarez made her senior debut for Guatemala on 16 February 2021 in a 3–1 friendly home win over Panama.

See also
List of Guatemala women's international footballers

References

External links
Andrea Álvarez at BDFútbol

2003 births
Living people
Sportspeople from Guatemala City
Guatemalan women's footballers
Women's association football forwards
Zaragoza CFF players
Segunda Federación (women) players
Guatemala women's international footballers
Guatemalan expatriate footballers
Guatemalan expatriate sportspeople in Spain
Expatriate women's footballers in Spain
SD Eibar Femenino players
Primera Federación (women) players